The Royal Institute of Albanian Studies (in Albanian: Instituti Mbretnuer i Studimeve Shqiptare) (1940-1944) was a scientific and cultural institute that preceded the Academy of Sciences of Albania.

Founded during the Albanian Kingdom (1939–43), it had four commissions:

Moral and Historical Sciences
Physical Mathematical and Natural Sciences
Language and Literature
Arts

The head of the Institute was Albanian writer and linguist Ernest Koliqi, whereas its general secretary was Italian priest and historian Giuseppe Valentini. Notable members of the institute included Eqrem Çabej, Aleksandër Xhuvani, Father Anton Harapi, Karl Gurakuqi, Lasgush Poradeci, Namik Resuli, Father Lazër Shantoja, Filip Fishta, Father Justin Rrota, Ilo Mitkë Qafëzezi, Anton Paluca, Xhevat Korça, Kolë Kamsi, Eqrem Vlora, Sotir Kolea, Vangjel Koca, and Dhimitër Beratti.

References 

Academy of Sciences of Albania
Science and technology in Albania
Language regulators
1940 establishments in Albania
Organizations established in 1940
Defunct organizations based in Albania
1944 disestablishments in Albania